Club Sportiv ACB Ineu, commonly known as ACB Ineu, or simply as Ineu, is a Romanian football club from Ineu, Arad County, Romania and currently playing in Liga IV – Arad County. Originally founded in 1920 as Victoria Ineu, the club was better known as Tricotaje Ineu when it played in 2003–04 Divizia B and 2004–05 Divizia B, finishing in both seasons on 9th positions.

History
ACB Ineu was founded in 1920 as Victoria Ineu and played in the district, regional and county championship between 1946 and 1978. In the 1977–78 season, Victoria Ineu managing to won the county championship and the promotion play-off against the champion of Caraș-Severin County, CFR Caransebeș (1–2 at Caransebeș and 1–0 at Ineu).

In the first three years in Divizia C, "Ineuanii" struggled to avoid the relegation, finishing 12th in the 1978–79 season and 13th in the 1979–80 and 1980–81 seasons. In the next season, 1981–82, they finished in the mid-table, 8th place. Preceded by  another two years in the mid-table, 11th in the 1982–83 season and 10th in the 1983–84,  the relegation  to the fourth division came after 1984–85 season when they finished in 15th place.
In 1985 Victoria Ineu reached the Round of 32 of the Cupa României losing in front of FC Olt Scornicești with 3–0.
In an attempt to make a comeback to the third division, in 1986, Victoria merge with another two teams from town, Metalul and Gloria, forming CS Ineu and won the Arad County Championship in 1988–89 season, but lost the promotion play-off against the champion of Bihor County, Minerul Ștei (0–1 at Ștei and 0–0 at Ineu).

In 2005, Tricotaje Ineu sold its place in Divizia B to FCM Reșița and bought its place in the third tier from Universitatea Reșița and renamed as CS Ineu.

In the summer of 2020, CS Ineu started a collaboration with Brosovszky Football Academy and was renamed as CS ACB Ineu.

Honours
Liga III
Runners-up (1): 2002–03

Liga IV – Arad County
Winners (5): 1977–78, 1988–89, 2000–01, 2012–13, 2021–22
Runners-up (2): 1972–73, 2020–21

Cupa României – Arad County
Winners (1): 1994–95

Players

First-team squad

Out on loan

Club officials

Board of directors

Current technical staff

League history

References

External links
Tricotaje Ineu on soccerway.com

Association football clubs established in 1920
Football clubs in Arad County
Liga II clubs
Liga III clubs
Liga IV clubs
1920 establishments in Romania